The 2004 Basingstoke and Deane Council election took place on 10 June 2004 to elect members of Basingstoke and Deane Borough Council in Hampshire, England. One third of the council was up for election and the council stayed under no overall control.

After the election, the composition of the council was:
Conservative 28
Liberal Democrats 16
Labour 12
Independent 4

Election result
The results saw the Conservatives gain 2 seats to hold 28 seats, level with the Labour and Liberal Democrat parties combined and leaving 4 Independents holding the balance on the council. The Conservatives increased their share of the vote and picked up Burghclere from a former Conservative turned independent, and Winklebury from Labour. Labour lost votes with the Labour leader of the council Rob Donnelly losing his seat in Popley East and the Liberal Democrats taking a seat from Labour in Brighton Hill South. Overall turnout in the election was 38.24%, in increase from the 31.33% in 2003, and put down to the European elections being held at the same time as the council election.

Following the election the Liberal Democrat and Labour alliance continued to run the council, after winning a 1-vote majority over the Conservatives at the annual council meeting. Independent Martin Biermann became chairman of the environment committee and a further 2 Independents became vice-chairmen of committees, leading to accusations by the Conservatives that a deal had been done with the Independents, but this was denied.

Ward results

References

2004
2004 English local elections
2000s in Hampshire